Eupithecia piccata is a moth in the family Geometridae first described by Pearsall in 1910. It is found in the US states of Arizona and New Mexico.

The wingspan is about 15 mm. Adults have smoky sprinkling over both wings.

References

Moths described in 1910
piccata
Moths of North America